James Willard Sage (August 13, 1922 – March 17, 1974) was a Canadian-American film and television actor.

Born in London, Ontario. Sage began his career in 1951, where he appeared in the film The Butler's Night Off, playing the role of a crook. He performed in New York where Sage played a lead role in the stage play Hobson's Choice. Sage played the role of the killer "Chester Davitt" in the 1954 film Dragnet. He then played the role of "Tom Tattle" in the 1955 film It's a Dog's Life. Sage played the role of "Jonathan Tatum" in the 1956 film The Brass Legend.

Sage guest-starred in television programs including Gunsmoke, Bonanza, Tales of Wells Fargo, Peter Gunn, The Man from U.N.C.L.E., Hogan's Heroes, Death Valley Days, Land of the Giants, 12 O'Clock High, The Deputy, Rawhide, The Life and Legend of Wyatt Earp, My Three Sons, The Virginian and Tales of the Texas Rangers. He played the role of "Tom Hodges" in the 1962 film That Touch of Mink. Sage also played the role of "Orson Roark" in the 1963 film For Love or Money. His last credit was from the detective television series Banacek.

Sage died in March 1974 in Sherman Oaks, California, at the age of 51.

References

External links 

Rotten Tomatoes profile

1922 births
1974 deaths
Male actors from London, Ontario
Canadian emigrants to the United States
American male film actors
American male television actors
Canadian male film actors
Canadian male television actors
20th-century American male actors
20th-century Canadian male actors